The following events occurred in January 1935:

January 1, 1935 (Tuesday)
The Alabama Crimson Tide beat the Stanford Indians 29-13 in the 21st Rose Bowl.
The first Orange Bowl was held; Bucknell Bison beat the Miami Hurricanes 26-0.
The first Sugar Bowl was held; the Tulane Green Wave beat the Temple Owls 20-14.
The Soviet Union abandoned a complicated bread card rationing system after six years and raised wages to keep up with inflation.
The Associated Press began wirephoto service.
In an attempt to stimulate trade, Newfoundland lowered most of its import tariffs.

January 2, 1935 (Wednesday)
The trial of Richard Hauptmann in the Lindbergh kidnapping case began in Flemington, New Jersey with jury selection.
The Anglo-Irish Trade War softened when Britain agreed to buy more cattle from the Irish Free State in exchange for selling more coal. 
Canadian Prime Minister R.B. Bennett began a series of radio broadcasts outlining what he called a New Deal for Canada. Proposed reforms included a minimum wage, a maximum work week and unemployment insurance.
The steamer Lexington sank in New York's East River after being rammed by the freighter Jane Christenson. 120 passengers and 51 crew were rescued by tugboats, but 4 people were believed to have perished.
Born: Lolo Soetoro, stepfather of Barack Obama, in Bandung, West Java, Dutch East Indies (d. 1987)

January 3, 1935 (Thursday)
On the first proper day of the Lindbergh kidnapping trial, Charles and Anne Morrow Lindbergh gave testimony.
Abyssinia Crisis: Ethiopia asked the League of Nations to act in accordance with Article XI of the League Covenant, which stated that "Any war or threat of war, whether immediately affecting any of the Members of the League or not, is hereby declared a matter of concern to the whole League, and the League shall take any action that may be deemed wise and effectual to safeguard the peace of nations." The League, however, postponed action on Ethiopia's request.
Nazi authorities released an American woman after holding her in prison 11 days for allegedly insulting Hitler.
Died: Francis Redwood, 95, Roman Catholic Archbishop of Wellington, Metropolitan of New Zealand

January 4, 1935 (Friday)
U.S. President Franklin D. Roosevelt delivered his second State of the Union address to Congress. Roosevelt pledged to reduce direct Federal relief and begin to replace it with localized programs, and said he would recommend unemployment insurance, social security and other benefits.
French Foreign Minister Pierre Laval arrived in Rome to hold discussions with Benito Mussolini.
The Erdek-Marmara Islands earthquake occurred in the Sea of Marmara, Turkey.
Born: Floyd Patterson, boxer, in Waco, North Carolina (d. 2006)

January 5, 1935 (Saturday)
40 coal miners in Poland ended their 11-day "suicide" hunger strike after local authorities promised to find work for them.
The Walt Disney-produced animated short film The Tortoise and the Hare was released.
Died: Clyde Smith, 33, Australian rules footballer and police constable (accidentally shot in the line of duty)

January 6, 1935 (Sunday)
The ocean liner Havana ran aground north of The Bahamas. All aboard were rescued although 1 man died of apoplexy in one of the lifeboats.
23 people were killed in a train crash on the Moscow to Leningrad line.
Born: Queen Margarita of Bulgaria, in Madrid, Spain; Nino Tempo, singer, in Niagara Falls, New York

January 7, 1935 (Monday)
Franco-Italian Agreement of 1935: France and Italy issued an official communique upon the conclusion of the Mussolini-Laval talks. The statement vaguely reported "agreements relating to the interests of the two countries in Africa and documents registering the community of views on European subjects." It was understood that France had agreed to allow Italy a free hand in dealing with Ethiopia in exchange for help containing Hitler.
The U.S. Supreme Court decided Gregory v. Helvering.
Born: Kenny Davern, jazz clarinetist, in Huntington, New York (d. 2006); Valeri Kubasov, cosmonaut, in Vyazniki, Vladimir Oblast, USSR (d. 2014); Ducky Schofield, baseball player, in Springfield, Illinois

January 8, 1935 (Tuesday)
Mao Zedong became a member of the Politburo Standing Committee of the Communist Party of China.
Five were shot in Mexico City when about 1,500 demonstrators stormed the youth headquarters of the Red Shirts, who opened fire in return.
Born: Elvis Presley, singer and actor, in Tupelo, Mississippi (d. 1977); Lewis H. Lapham, writer and publisher, in San Francisco, California; 
Died: Russell Gibson, American bank robber (shot by FBI agents)

January 9, 1935 (Wednesday)
The joint U.S.-Canadian commission appointed to arbitrate the controversy surrounding the sinking of the rum-running ship I'm Alone in March 1929 ruled that the United States should apologize for sinking the vessel and pay $25,000 compensation.
Born: Bob Denver, actor, in New Rochelle, New York (d. 2005); Dick Enberg, sportscaster, in Mount Clemens, Michigan (d. 2017); John Graham, rugby union player and educator, in Stratford, New Zealand (d. 2017); Earl G. Graves Sr., entrepreneur and publisher, in Brooklyn, New York (d. 2020); Brian Harradine, politician, in Quorn, South Australia (d. 2014)

January 10, 1935 (Thursday)
Mary Pickford won a divorce from Douglas Fairbanks in a Los Angeles court.
A newspaper in France published the results of a survey asking whom the French would prefer to have as a dictator if their country were to have one. Philippe Pétain received the most votes.
Born: Ronnie Hawkins, rockabilly musician, in Huntsville, Arkansas; Sherrill Milnes, operatic baritone, in Downers Grove, Illinois

January 11, 1935 (Friday)
A handwriting expert at the Lindbergh kidnapping trial testified that Richard Hauptmann wrote all the ransom notes.
Died: Marcella Sembrich, 76, Polish coloratura soprano

January 12, 1935 (Saturday)
Amelia Earhart completed the first solo flight ever made between Hawaii and California, landing in Oakland 18 hours and 16 minutes after takeoff from Wheeler Field. 
Born: The Amazing Kreskin, mentalist, in Montclair, New Jersey

January 13, 1935 (Sunday)
A referendum on territorial status was held in the Territory of the Saar Basin. The results would not be known until Tuesday.

January 14, 1935 (Monday)
The Mosul–Haifa oil pipeline opened in the Near East.
The Lower Zambezi Railroad Bridge, the longest bridge in Africa at more than 2 miles, opened in Mozambique.
Born: Lucile Wheeler, alpine ski racer, in Saint-Jovite, Quebec, Canada

January 15, 1935 (Tuesday)
The plebiscite commission of the League of Nations announced that the Saar had voted overwhelmingly (about 90%) for reunification with Germany.
Hitler gave a radio address on the results of the plebiscite, saying that "Fifteen years of distress, which was a painful period for all Germans, has finally ended. The joy of the return is the joy of the entire nation."
The Salvadoran presidential election concluded after three days. Maximiliano Hernández Martínez ran unopposed and claimed 100% of the vote.

January 16, 1935 (Wednesday)
19 people, including Leo Kamenev and Grigory Zinoviev, pleaded guilty in Soviet court to conspiring to assassinate Sergei Kirov.
President Roosevelt sent a special message to the Senate urging ratification of American adherence to the World Court.
Born: A. J. Foyt, automobile racing driver, in Houston, Texas; Udo Lattek, football player and coach, in Bosemb, Germany (d. 2015)
Died: Ma Barker, 61, matriarch of the Barker gang (killed by law enforcement)

January 17, 1935 (Thursday)
Zinoviev was sentenced to 10 years imprisonment and Kamenev to 5. The court ruled that they had no direct connection to the Kirov murder but knew of the terroristic character of the group that carried it out.
The League of Nations decided to return control of the Saar to Germany on March 1.
Born: Ruth Ann Minner, politician and businesswoman, in Sussex County, Delaware

January 18, 1935 (Friday)
The French cabinet decided to make Maurice Gamelin the new Commander-in-Chief of the country's armed forces to replace Maxime Weygand, who was about to reach the mandatory retirement age of 68 on Monday.
The city of Lima, Peru celebrated the 400th anniversary of its founding.
The film David Copperfield based on the Charles Dickens novel was released.
Born: Jon Stallworthy, professor and poet, in London (d. 2014)

January 19, 1935 (Saturday)
Briefs first went on sale at Marshall Field's department store in Chicago.
Salvador Dalí and his wife Gala left the United States after a very successful two-month visit.
Born: Soumitra Chatterjee, actor and poet, in Krishnanagar, Bengal Presidency (d. 2020)
Died: Lloyd Hamilton, 43, American silent film comedian

January 20, 1935 (Sunday)
Gangster Alvin Karpis and accomplice Harry Campbell shot their way out of a police trap in Atlantic City, New Jersey. Authorities seemingly had them cornered in their hotel room, but they escaped into an alley, stole a car and managed to evade police in a citywide chase.
The Norwegian Ice Hockey Association became a member of the International Ice Hockey Federation.

January 21, 1935 (Monday)
A mine explosion killed 13 in Gilberton, Pennsylvania.
Attempted exclusion of Egon Kisch from Australia: Egon Kisch was convicted in Australian court on a charge of being a prohibited immigrant.
Died: Adolf von Brauchitsch, 58, German army general

January 22, 1935 (Tuesday)
Pencho Zlatev became the 25th Prime Minister of Bulgaria.
Egon Kisch was sentenced to three months of hard labour.

January 23, 1935 (Wednesday)
Japanese forces launched a surprise attack from Manchukuo on Chahar Province in China.
Born: Jerry Tubbs, American football player, in Throckmorton County, Texas (d. 2012)

January 24, 1935 (Thursday)
Richard Hauptmann took the stand in his own defense in the Lindbergh kidnapping trial.
The cargo liner Mohawk was rammed by a Norwegian freighter and sank off Manasquan, New Jersey with the loss of 46 lives.
Beer was sold in cans for the first time in Richmond, Virginia by the Krueger Brewing Company.
Died: John Barton Payne, 79, American politician, lawyer and judge

January 25, 1935 (Friday)
The U.S. House of Representatives voted another $11.5 billion to fund the New Deal.
São Paulo Futebol Clube was founded in Brazil.
Born: António Ramalho Eanes, general and politician, in Alcains, Castelo Branco, Portugal
Died: Valerian Kuybyshev, 46, Russian revolutionary and Soviet politician

January 26, 1935 (Saturday)
Governor of Louisiana Oscar K. Allen declared martial law in Baton Rouge as National Guardsmen fired on about 100 armed citizens who were opposed to Huey Long. 1 was wounded.

January 27, 1935 (Sunday)
Hermann Göring visited Warsaw for a four-day visit in which he unsuccessfully sought an alliance with Poland against the Soviet Union.
Police in Mukden, China shot 86 striking workers. 60 more were wounded and more than 500 were arrested.
Uruguay beat Argentina 3-0 on the final day of the South American Championship to win the tournament with a perfect 3–0 record.

January 28, 1935 (Monday)
Iceland passed a law legalizing abortion in certain circumstances. This is often cited as the first law of its kind in the world, although other countries like Mexico had previously passed laws allowing for abortion under certain conditions, and Soviet Russia passed a short-lived law permitting it in 1920.
Died: Mikhail Ippolitov-Ivanov, 75, Russian composer, conductor and teacher

January 29, 1935 (Tuesday)
The U.S. Senate voted 52-36 against entry into the World Court.
Born: Roger Payne, biologist and environmentalist, in South Woodstock, Vermont

January 30, 1935 (Wednesday)
Mikhail Tukhachevsky told the All-Union Congress of Soviets that the Red Army was 940,000 strong, a significant jump from 600,000 four years earlier.
In a proclamation issued on the second anniversary of his coming to power, Adolf Hitler said the Nazis had already fulfilled two-thirds of the programs they had promised to complete in four years.
The comedic play Three Men on a Horse by George Abbott and John Cecil Holm premiered at the Playhouse Theatre on Broadway.
Born: Richard Brautigan, writer, in Tacoma, Washington (d. 1984)

January 31, 1935 (Thursday)
A Deruluft passenger plane en route from Königsberg to Berlin crashed in Stettin, killing all 11 aboard.
Buenos Aires had its hottest day in 78 years, reaching 104.5 degrees Fahrenheit (40.2 Celsius).
The romantic comedy film The Good Fairy starring Margaret Sullavan premiered in New York City.
Born: Kenzaburō Ōe, writer and Nobel laureate, in Uchiko, Ehime, Japan
Died: Richard Washburn Child, 53, American author and diplomat

References

1935
1935-01
1935-01